The Event of Mubahala was a meeting between the Islamic prophet Muhammad and a Christian delegation from Najran (present-day Saudi Arabia), in the month of Dhul-Hijjah, 10 A.H. (October 631 C.E., October 631–32, October 632–33), where Muhammad called for invoking a curse to reveal who was lying about their religious differences.

The initial effort was to invite the Najrani Christians to Islam, and the acknowledgement of Muhammad as a prophet. During religious discussions of similarities and differences, the topic of the divinity of 'Īsā (Jesus) arose. The Christians refused to accept Muhammad's teachings about Christ and refused denying their beliefs. Muhammad suggested invoking a mubahalah (prayer curse) regarding their refusal, and included his household in the call to invoke a curse.

The event is commemorated annually on 24 Dhu al-Hijjah by the Shia, and is an inceptual argument for them in proving that Ahl al-Kisaʾ (People of the Cloak) are the Ahl al-Bayt (People of the Household [of Muhammad]) mentioned in the Quran.

Concept

Al-Mubahalah is derived from the Arabic word bahlah, with bahala ) being a root verb which means "to curse". Al-Bahl is also used to mean a scarcity of water. The term mubahalah can also mean withdrawing mercy from one who lies or engages in falsehood.

In the Quran, the mubahalah (invocation of God's curse) was mentioned as a decisive solution to the dispute over Jesus between the Christians of Najran and Muhammad. Allah ordered Muhammad to call on the Christians to invoke His curse (mubahala – verse 3.61) upon those who are intentionally unjust in their claim in order to determine who was telling the truth.

The Quran's verse of mubahala is one of the most controversial verses due to the debate with Christianity and more-so, the division between Shi'ites and Sunnis within Islam. Praying for God to curse the liar regarding religious disputes is an ancient Arabic tradition. Mubahalas were common among Semitic tribes, being found in writings that existed prior to Muhammad's preaching of Islam.

The event of the Mubahalah is an instance of the Quran's critique of Christians doctrine; God on earth as Christ (Incarnation). From this historical event, Muslims were to continue debating major points of the Christians' faith with Christians defending and defining their doctrines and practices.

Background
In the ninth year of the Hijrah, Muhammad is reported to have sent a letter to Abd al-Harith ibn Alqama, the Grand Bishop of Najran, the official representative of the Roman Church in the Hejaz, inviting the people of that area to embrace Islam. In response to that letter a delegation was sent to Muhammad.

Between 21 and 25 of Dhu'l-Hijja 10 A.H. / 22 to 26 March 632 A.D. [specific dates contested], the delegation arrived and discussions of religion and theology began, with the subject eventually turning to Jesus the Messiah, and the question of defining what and who Jesus really is compared to what he is actually understood to be for each party. Muhammad preached to them that Jesus is a human being granted revelation by God and requested them to accept Islam. The Christians, however, were not convinced and responded with their explanations of Christ being divine.

Because of the Christians' refusal to accept Muhammad's demand to acknowledge his message of Jesus, at odds with the Christians' view of Jesus' divinity as the Son of God, the call to invoke a curse was initiated by Muhammad in order for God to disclose the truth in a practical manner.

According to the Ismalic tradition, after being unable to resolve the conflict over who Jesus is, the verse of Mubahalah (Quran 3:61) was revealed to Muhammad: We include the Mubahalah verse and its previous two verses.

Traditional narrative from hadiths
According to Ibn Hisham's sirah, Muhammad recited the verses of Mubahalah to the Christians, and after lengthy discussions, no agreement was reached on the position and standing of Jesus. At the end of the discussions, Muhammad demanded that the two sides engage in a Mubahalah.

The Christians returned to the place they were staying. Their leader, As-Sayyid Al-'Aqib, advised them saying: "If he challenges us with his people, we accept the challenge for he is not a prophet; but if he challenges us with his family in particular we don't challenge him, for he is not going to put forward his family unless he is truthful."

The morning of the 24th of Dhul-Hijjah, Muhammad emerged at the appointed time. It is reported that he brought only selected members of his family, carrying Al-Husayn in his arm with Al-Hasan holding his hand, followed by Fatimah and Ali ibn Abu Talib. Tradition states that the Christians were surprised when they saw Muhammad's family accompanying him, and decided not to invoke a curse upon him and the others. They instead asked for peace, by offering Muhammad tribute in return for protection. Islamic sources offer various explanations of the outcome. Some narratives suggest that the Christians would have perished by the end of the year if they had entered into the imprecations.

Muhammad offered to do the Mubahalah, asking each conflicting party to cover themselves with a cloak, and that all parties ask God sincerely to destroy and inflict with curses on the lying party and their families. The Christians consulted each other, and Abdul Haris lbne Alqama, a scholar among them, talked them out of carrying out the Mubahala.

The Christians refused, so Muhammad gave them two alternatives: either to convert to Islam or pay the Jizyah (a tax on free non-Muslims under Muslim rule). The Christians agreed to pay tribute, and asked Muhammad to send with them a trustworthy man to aid them in judging monetary disputes amongst themselves. Muhammad is said to have agreed and appointed Abu Ubaydah ibn al-Jarrah, out of a large group of willing and hopeful contenders.

Accounts of the Christians' response
The earliest Islamic testimonials (hadiths) and histories report different details regarding the dialogue between the Christians and Muhammad which some of them have been brought in following:

Ibn Ishaq reports in his Sirat al-Nabi that the delegation's leader is convinced of Muhammad's prophethood and advises cursing Muhammad would be a disaster.

In Muqatil, the Christian leader simply says that, in any scenario, cursing Muhammad would be disastrous and that Allāh will destroy the liars by the end of the year.

Al-Tabari reports uncertainty among the Christians and that, according to Amir al-Shabi, after the Christians initially accepted the mubahalah, they later sought advice from a wise man in their group, with that man rebuking them and convincing them not to invoke the curse.

Ibn Sa'd doesn't provide details of the dialogue aside from the Christian leader responding to Muhammad with "We think it proper not to curse you. You may order us as you like and we shall obey you and shall make peace with you."

Participants
Regarding the participants in the Event of Mubahala, Madelung argues that abnāʾanā in the Verse of Mubahala (Quran 3:61) must refer to Muhammad's grandchildren, Al-Hasan and Al-Husayn. In that case, he continues, it would be reasonable to also include in the event their parents, Ali and Fatimah. Of those present on Muhammad's side, Shia traditions are unanimous that nisāʾnā refers to Fatima, and that anfusanā refers to Ali. In particular, since the verse uses the phrase anfusanā for Ali and Muhammad, the Shia hold that the former enjoys the same authority as the prophet. In contrast, most Sunni accounts by al-Tabari do not name the participants of the event, while some other Sunni historians agree with the Shia view. 

Some accounts about the event add that Muhammad, Ali, Fatima, Hasan, and Husayn stood under Muhammad's cloak, and that this five are thus known as the ahl al-Kisa. Madelung writes that their inclusion by Muhammad in this significant ritual must have raised the religious rank of his family. A similar view is voiced by Lalani.

Modern understanding
According to Sidney H. Griffith, it is noteworthy that in this passage the Quran leaves the judgment with God, once the two parties "would have staked their lives and those of their loved ones on their own steadfastness in faith".

Parts of the Quran are interpreted as forging a continuous dialogue between Muslims and Christians, in the same time, however, it assumes that the dialogue between Jews, Christians, and Muslims will sometimes take the form of arguments about religion, for one passage says, "Do not dispute with the People of the Book save in the fairest way; Except for those who are evil doers." And say: "We believe in what has been sent down to us and what has been sent to you. Our God and your God are one and to Him we are submissive."

Archeologist and historical linguist, Dr. Mohammed Maraqten, states regarding how ancient Arabic practices fashioned Islamic thought:

Summary from Muqatil's Tafsir explains the event of Mubahala was less about the confrontation with the Najran Christians but more about the authority of Muḥammad and his claim of prophethood. As explained in the Muqatil's exegesis, the divinity of Jesus was less of a precedent despite the legend of the confrontation between Muhammad and the Christians. According to Gordon Nickel, the effort instead, as described in the Tafsir, was to determine the Jewish community of Madina and the Najrani Christians to be subordinate to Muhammad's honor.

According to Muhammad Husayn Tabataba'i in Tafsir al-Mizan, Muhammad said that the Christians escaped being turned into monkeys and pigs, and all of Najran would have perished within a year of the mubahala.

Eid al-Mubahalah
The ʿĪd al-Mubāhalah is an annual Shi'ite Muslim commemoration of the Mubahalah. While Eid al-Mubahalah is always on nearly the same day (24 Dhu al-Hijjah) of the Islamic calendar, the date on the Gregorian calendar varies from year to year because of differences between the two calendars, since the Islamic calendar, the Hijri calendar (AH), is a lunar calendar and the Gregorian calendar is a solar calendar. This date is shown for a selection of years, according to the Calendar center of Geophysics institute of Tehran University, in the table below:

See also
 Abrahamic religions
 Curse
 Imprecatory Psalms

Notes

References

Sources

External links
 Tafseer al-Mizan, exegesis of 3:61–63
 Peshawar Nights
 Mubahalah in Persian

7th century in religion
Hadith
Fatimah
Shia days of remembrance
Shia Islam
Sunni Islam
Christianity and Islam
Life of Muhammad
History of Shia Islam